George Victor "Mick" Pleass (12 November 1874 – 27 August 1925) was an Australian rules footballer who played with South Melbourne and Essendon in the VFA and Victorian Football League (VFL).

Football
Pleass was a follower and played his early football at South Melbourne when they were in the Victorian Football Association (VFA). 

He participated in their inaugural VFL match and remained with the club until 1904 when he crossed to Essendon, after his transfer to play for Boulder in the Western Australian Goldfields was refused. During his career he represented Victoria at interstate football on three occasions.

At the end of the 1899 season, in the process of naming his own "champion player", the football correspondent for The Argus ("Old Boy"), selected a team of the best players of the 1899 VFL competition:Backs: Maurie Collins (Essendon), Bill Proudfoot (Collingwood), Peter Burns (Geelong); Halfbacks: Pat Hickey (Fitzroy), George Davidson (South Melbourne), Alf Wood (Melbourne); Centres: Fred Leach (Collingwood), Firth McCallum (Geelong), Harry Wright (Essendon); Wings: Charlie Pannam (Collingwood), Eddie Drohan (Fitzroy), Herb Howson (South Melbourne); Forwards: Bill Jackson (Essendon), Eddy James (Geelong), Charlie Colgan (South Melbourne); Ruck: Mick Pleass (South Melbourne), Frank Hailwood (Collingwood), Joe McShane (Geelong); Rovers: Dick Condon (Collingwood), Bill McSpeerin (Fitzroy), Teddy Rankin (Geelong).From those he considered to be the three best players — that is, Condon, Hickey, and Pleass — he selected Pat Hickey as his "champion player" of the season. ('Old Boy', "Football: A Review of the Season", (Monday, 18 September 1899), p.6).

A ruckman, Pleass briefly gave the game away in 1902 to become a field umpire but returned to South Melbourne after officiating in a couple of games.

Death
He died at the Kalgoorlie Government Hospital, in Boulder, Western Australia on 27 August 1925.

See also
 The Footballers' Alphabet

Notes

References
 'Follower', "The Footballers' Alphabet", The Leader, (Saturday, 23 July 1898), p. 17: "P is for Pleass, unsurpassed in the ruck".
 South Melbourne Team, Melbourne Punch, (Thursday, 4 June 1903), p. 16.
 Maplestone, M., Flying Higher: History of the Essendon Football Club 1872–1996, Essendon Football Club, (Melbourne), 1996.

External links

1874 births
1925 deaths
Australian rules footballers from Victoria (Australia)
Australian Rules footballers: place kick exponents
Sydney Swans players
Essendon Football Club players
Australian Football League umpires
South Melbourne Football Club (VFA) players
Australian rules footballers from Adelaide